Daphne Lilian Evelyn Hasenjäger (born 2 July 1929) is a South African former athlete, who was born as Daphne Robb. She competed for South Africa at the 1952 Summer Olympics held in Helsinki, Finland in the 100 metres, where she won the silver medal splitting Australians Marjorie Jackson and Shirley Strickland.

References

1929 births
Living people
South African female sprinters
Olympic silver medalists for South Africa
Olympic athletes of South Africa
Athletes (track and field) at the 1948 Summer Olympics
Athletes (track and field) at the 1952 Summer Olympics
Sportspeople from Pretoria
Medalists at the 1952 Summer Olympics
Athletes (track and field) at the 1950 British Empire Games
Commonwealth Games bronze medallists for South Africa
Commonwealth Games medallists in athletics
Olympic silver medalists in athletics (track and field)
20th-century South African women
Medallists at the 1950 British Empire Games